The Rat Pack - Live From Las Vegas is a stage musical produced by Flying Music Group Ltd. The stage show was conceived and created by Mitch Sebastian, who was also the show's director and choreographer.

Overview
Developed over three years the original production opened outside London at the Beck Theatre, Hayes in January 2000. A short tour featured Louis Hoover as Frank Sinatra, Michael Howe as Dean Martin and Peter Straker as Sammy Davis Junior. The show was rewritten and new set designs were added for a second UK tour in 2001 with Clive Carter and George Daniel Long playing Dean Martin and Sammy Davis Junior. It was not until the 2002 UK Tour that the show found its audience. Further rewrites and new set designs by Sean Kavanagh with costume designs by Paul Clarke and a cast that featured Stephen Triffit (Frank) Mark Adams (Dean) and George Daniel Long (Sammy) performed a sold-out 6-month tour.

The production transferred to the West End for a limited six-week engagement at Theatre Royal Haymarket in 2003. Due to rave reviews and sold-out performances, the run was extended for a further six weeks before transferring to Strand Theatre (now Novello Theatre), where it played for two years breaking all box office records in advance sales. The original West End cast starred Mark Adams (Martin), George Daniel Long (Davis Jr), and Stephen Triffitt (Sinatra). In May 2005, the show transferred to the Savoy Theatre where it ran for another two years,  exceeding over 1000 consecutive performances.

A new limited season was performed at the Adelphi Theatre in London from September 2009 to January 2010 starring Craige Els (Martin), Giles Terrera (Davis Jr), and Louis Hoover (Sinatra). It returned for another limited season to the Wyndhams Theatre in 2011–2012 with the original cast.

It currently holds the record for playing in the most houses (eight) in London's West End. The production has played the following West End Theatres from 2003 - 2014  Peacock Theatre, Theatre Royal Haymarket,  Novello Theatre , Savoy Theatre, London Palladium, Theatre Royal Drury Lane, Adelphi Theatre and Wyndham's Theatre. On 13 December 2017 it returned to the Theatre Royal Haymarket and in January the show was enhanced with a celebration of Ella Fitzgerald's centenary. Ella Fitzgerald is played by Nicola Emmanuelle. It will close in February 2018 followed by another U.K. Tour which will finish on June 9, 2018.

A European tour premiered in 2004 and ran for four years playing, Germany, Austria, Italy, Spain, Norway and Denmark.

The show was renamed "The Ratpack Live from the Sands" when it embarked on its first USA Tour in 2005. It continued to tour America as part of the Broadway series for a subsequent four seasons. Other productions opened in Toronto, Canon Theatre.

Mitch Sebastian also directed the film for PBS in America. It is currently available on Amazon (Giles Terrera appears as Sammy Davis Junior)

Original West End cast recording was made early in the run at the Novello Theatre featuring the original cast.

The show was nominated for BEST NEW MUSICAL in the WhatsOnStage awards and for BEST ENTERTAINMENT in the 2003 Laurence Olivier Awards.

References

2003 musicals
West End musicals